The 2020 Vuelta a San Juan was a road cycling stage race that took place in the San Juan Province of Argentina between 26 January and 2 February 2020. The race is rated as a 2.Pro event as part of the 2020 UCI America Tour and the 2020 UCI ProSeries, and was the 38th edition of the Vuelta a San Juan.

Teams
Twenty-seven teams were invited to the race. Of these teams, six are UCI WorldTour teams, five are UCI Professional Continental teams, nine are UCI Continental teams, and seven are national teams. While the six Argentinean teams (Argentina, and ) entered seven riders, the other 21 teams submitted six riders, resulting in a starting peloton of 168 riders, of which 155 riders finished the race.

UCI WorldTeams

 
 
 
 
 
 

UCI Professional Continental Teams

 
 
 
 
 

UCI Continental Teams

 
 
 
 
 
 
 
 
 

National Teams

 Argentina
 Brazil
 Italy
 Panama
 Peru
 Russia
 Venezuela

Route

Stages

Stage 1 
26 January 2020 — San Juan to San Juan,

Stage 2 
27 January 2020 — Pocito to Pocito,

Stage 3 
28 January 2020 — Ullúm to Punta Negra,  (ITT)

Stage 4 
29 January 2020 — San José de Jáchal to Villa San Agustín,

Rest day 
30 January 2020

Stage 5 
31 January 2020 —  to Alto Colorado,

Stage 6 
1 February 2020 —  to Autódromo El Villicúm,

Stage 7 
2 February 2020 — San Juan to San Juan,

Classification leadership table

Final classification standings

General classification

Sprints classification

Mountains classification

Young rider classification

Teams classification

References

2020
2020 UCI ProSeries
2020 UCI America Tour
2020 in Argentine sport
January 2020 sports events in Argentina
February 2020 sports events in Argentina